The Archiepiscopal Exarchate of Lutsk (Lutsk of the Ukrainians) is an Archiepiscopal Exarchate (rare Eastern Catholic pre-diocesan jurisdiction, comparable to a Patriarchal exarchate, Apostolic exarchate or Latin Apostolic vicariate; both other cases are also Ukrainian Catholic) in Ukraine of the Ukrainian Greek Catholic Church (Byzantine Rite in Ukrainian language).

Its cathedral episcopal see is the Cathedral of the Nativity of the Theotokos, in Lutsk (Луцьк), Volyn Oblast.

Statistics 
As per 2014, it pastorally served 3,173 Catholics in 26 parishes with 25 priests (15 diocesan, 10 religious), 12 lay religious brothers and 6 seminarians.

History 
It was established on 15 January 2008 as Archiepiscopal Exarchate of Lutsk (Luc’k in Curiate Italian), on Ukrainian territory split off from the Ukrainian Catholic Major Archeparchy of Kyiv-Halych, which is the Chief (almost a Patriarch) of the particular church sui iuris, to which it is immediately subject, but not formally a Suffragan, and further depends on the Roman Congregation for the Oriental Churches.

It can be considered the de facto successor of the Ukrainian Catholic Eparchy of Lutsk–Ostroh, which was founded in 1589, twice suppressed and restored, was finally suppressed in 1839, nominally restored as a titular bishopric in 1921 and suppressed even as such in 1973.

Episcopal ordinaries
(all Ukrainian Rite)
 
 Archiepiscopal Exarchs 
 Yosafat Hovera (2008.01.15 – ...), Titular Bishop of Cæsariana (2008.01.15 – ...).

See also 
 Latin Roman Catholic Diocese of Lutsk
 Ukrainian Catholic Eparchy of Lutsk–Ostroh
 Ukrainian Catholic Eparchy of Volodymyr–Brest
 Exarch

External links 
 Official website
 GCatholic.org with Google satellite photo
 Exarchate of Lutsk

Ukrainian Greek Catholic Church
Eastern Catholic exarchates